The 2005–06 Northern Premier League season was the 38th in the history of the Northern Premier League, a football competition in England. Teams were divided into two divisions; the Premier and the First.

Premier Division 

The Premier Division featured six new clubs:
 Ashton United relegated from Conference North
 Bradford Park Avenue relegated from Conference North
 Runcorn F.C. Halton relegated from Conference North
 North Ferriby United as champions from Division One.
 Ilkeston Town as runners-up from Division One.
 A.F.C. Telford United via play-offs from Division One.

League table

Results

Play-offs 
The Premier Division playoffs saw the second to fifth placed sides in the Division compete for one place in the Conference North.

* After extra time

Division One 

Division One featured four new clubs:
Bamber Bridge, relegated from the NPL Premier Division
Bishop Auckland, relegated from the NPL Premier Division
Bridlington Town, relegated from the NPL Premier Division
Fleetwood Town, promoted from the North West Counties League Division One
Goole, promoted from the Northern Counties East League Premier Division

League table

Results

Play-offs 
The First Division playoffs saw the third to sixth placed sides in the First Division compete for a place in the Premier Division.

Promotion and relegation 
In the thirty-eighth season of the Northern Premier League Blyth Spartans (as champions) and Farsley Celtic (as play-off winners) were promoted to the Conference North. Wakefield, Bradford Park Avenue and Runcorn Halton were relegated to the First Division; these three clubs were replaced by relegated Conference North side Hednesford Town, First Division winners Mossley, second placed Fleetwood Town and play-off winners Kendal Town. In the First Division Bishop Auckland were relegated and were replaced by Buxton, Cammell Laird, Harrogate Railway Athletic, Alsager Town and Skelmersdale United.

Cup Results
Challenge Cup: Teams from both leagues.

Farsley Celtic 1–0 Stocksbridge Park Steels

President's Cup: 'Plate' competition for losing teams in the NPL Cup.

Bradford Park Avenue 1–0 Ilkeston Town

Chairman's Cup: 'Plate' competition for losing teams in the NPL Cup.

Blyth Spartans bt. Ossett Town

Peter Swales Shield: Between Champions of NPL Premier Division and Winners of the NPL Cup.

Blyth Spartans bt. Farsley Celtic

See also
Northern Premier League
2005–06 Isthmian League
2005–06 Southern Football League

References

External links 
 2005–06 Northern Premier League tables at FCHD

Northern Premier League seasons
7